, also known as  or , is the largest river in Nordland county, Norway. Its headwaters lie in the mountains of Børgefjell National Park at the lake Simskardvatnet. The river runs through the municipalities of Hattfjelldal, Grane, and Vefsn. The southern parts of the river are sometimes called the river Susna. The river flows north, not far from the Swedish border, and some of the minor tributaries come from Sweden. At the town of Mosjøen, the river discharges into the Vefsnfjord. The Laksforsen waterfall lies along its course.

Historically, it was an important salmon fishery, but it has now been infected with the salmon parasite Gyrodactylus salaris.

Media gallery

See also
List of rivers in Norway

References

Rivers of Nordland
Hattfjelldal
Vefsn
Grane, Nordland
Rivers of Norway